W8XWJ was a Detroit, Michigan "experimental audio broadcasting station", owned by the Detroit News, which operated from 1936 to 1940. It was classified as an Apex broadcasting station, i.e. it provided programming intended for the general public over what was then known as "ultra-high short-wave" frequencies. W8XWJ primarily broadcast unique programming, although it sometimes simulcast programs originating from co-owned AM station WWJ. In April 1940, W8XWJ was shut down, in order to be converted to a commercial FM station.

History

W8XWJ made its debut on January 29, 1936, as an AM station broadcasting on 31.6 MHz. Its start received national attention, with Variety calling the debut "a choice affair".

A promotional review of W8XWJ's early operations summarized its activities as:

In late 1937 the Federal Communications Commission (FCC) formally set aside a band of 75 frequencies for use by "Apex" broadcasting stations, and the following January W8XWJ was assigned to 42.06 MHz. The station also announced that it had upgraded its transmitter from 100 to 500 watts and was broadcasting fourteen hours a day, with most of its programming unique to the station.

A major restriction on the Apex band stations was that, because they were operating under experimental authorizations, they could not run commercials, except in the case where they were rebroadcasting programming from an existing station. In 1938 it was reported that station general manager William Scripps was promoting the idea of creating commercial licenses for Apex stations, but this never took place.

In the late 1930s the FCC determined that for most purposes FM transmissions were superior to the AM (amplitude modulation) employed by the Apex stations, and began to shut down the existing experimental grants. Its May 18, 1940 "Order No. 67" allocated the frequencies from 42 to 50 MHz to a new commercial FM station band, effective January 1, 1941. Its subsequent "Order No. 69" included W8XWJ in a list of stations to be deleted by a January 1st deadline.

However, in anticipation of the FCC's actions the Detroit News had already begun the process of replacing W8XWJ with an FM station, and had ended its broadcasts on April 13, 1940. Beginning on May 13, 1941 the upgraded facility, employing W8XWJ's former Penobscot Building studios and transmitter site, returned to the airwaves as Michigan's first FM station, W45D (now WXYT-FM).

References

External links
FCC History Cards for W8XWJ (covering 1936-1940)
 FCC History Cards for WXYT-FM (covering  W45D / WENA / WWJ-FM from 1940-1979)
 "A Detroit Apex Station in 1936" by John Schneider, Radio World, September 17, 2013. 

Radio stations established in 1936
Radio stations disestablished in 1940
1936 establishments in Michigan
1940 disestablishments in Michigan 
Defunct radio stations in the United States 
8XWJ